MC Léo da Baixada, stage name of Leonardo de Freitas Cruz (São Vicente, June 19, 1992) is a singer-songwriter. One of his most notable songs is "Ostentação fora do Normal", with the participation of MC Daleste. In 2012 began his first TV appearances.

Discography

Albums
"Fora do Normal" (2014)
"Ostentação Fora do Normal" (2013)

Singles

"Ostentação Fora do Normal (featuring MC Daleste)"
"Pai das Folhas"
"Audi ou RR"
"Conforto de Patrão"
"Vida Diferenciada" (featuring MC Pedrinho)
"Ubatuba"
"Ter Uma Noção"
"Roubando a Cena (featuring MC Jonão)
"Foi Assim Que Eu Aprendi" (featuring MC Nego do Borel)
"Firma Milionária (featuring MC Frank)
"Se Empenhar"
"Bala Gold"
"Água de Côco (featuring MC Menor da VG)
"As Estruturas (featuring MC Davi)

References 

Funk carioca musicians
Musicians from São Paulo (state)
1992 births
Living people